Fabien Cousin (born 21 January 1969) is a Belgian former professional tennis player.

Cousin competed on the professional tennis tour in the 1990s and had a best singles ranking of 284 in the world. He qualified for his only ATP Tour main draw at the 1992 Lyon Grand Prix, where he lost his first round match in three sets to world number 22 Karel Nováček.

References

External links
 
 

1969 births
Living people
Belgian male tennis players